DSV may refer to:

In sports:
 DSV Leoben, a football team based in Leoben, Austria
 German Swimming Federation (Deutscher Schwimm-Verband)
 German Ski Association (Deutscher Skiverband)

In transportation:
 DSV (company), a Danish transport company
 Dansville Municipal Airport (IATA code) in Dansville, New York
 deep-submergence vehicles, deep-diving self-propelled crewed submarines
 diving support vessel, a ship used in commercial diving
 German State Railway Wagon Association (Deutscher Staatsbahnwagenverband)

In computing:

 delimiter-separated values, a way to store two-dimensional arrays of data, in textual form

In culture:
 seaQuest DSV, an American science fiction television series (later renamed seaQuest 2032)

In other uses:
 Deutsche Schule Valparaiso, a German international school in Viña del Mar/Valparaiso, Chile
 Deutsche Schule Valencia, a German international school in Valencia, Spain
 Life Sciences Division (Division des Sciences du Vivant) of the French Alternative Energies and Atomic Energy Commission